"City Flat" is a song by Australian rock band Boom Crash Opera, released in 1987 as the third single from their self-titled studio album. The song peaked at number 42 in Australia.

Track listing 
 "City Flat" (Peter Farnan, Richard Pleasance) – 4:02
 "Spirit of Progress" (Peter Farnan, Richard Pleasance, Dale Ryder, Peter Maslen) – 3:51
 "City Flat" (Extended Mix) (Peter Farnan, Richard Pleasance) – 6:34

Personnel 
 Peter Farnan – guitar, vocals
 Peter Maslen – drums, vocals
 Greg O'Connor – keyboards
 Richard Pleasance – guitar, bass, vocals
 Dale Ryder – lead vocals

Charts

Weekly charts

References

External links 
 City Flat (12" single)
 City Flat (7" single)

1987 songs
1987 singles
Boom Crash Opera songs
Warner Music Group singles
Songs written by Richard Pleasance